The Bob Graham Sunshine Skyway Bridge, often referred to as the Sunshine Skyway Bridge or the Sunshine Skyway, consists of a pair of long beam bridges with a central cable-stayed bridge that spans Lower Tampa Bay to connect St. Petersburg, Florida to Terra Ceia. The current Sunshine Skyway opened in 1987 and is the second bridge of that name on the site. It was designed by the Figg & Muller Engineering Group and built by the American Bridge Company. The bridge is considered the flagship bridge of Florida and serves as a gateway to Tampa Bay. The four-lane bridge carries Interstate 275 and U.S. Route 19, passing through Pinellas County, Hillsborough County and Manatee County. It is a toll road, with a $1.50 toll assessed on two-axle vehicles traveling in either direction and collected via cash or the state's SunPass system.

The original Sunshine Skyway was a two-lane beam bridge with a central truss bridge built directly to the west of the current structure. It was completed in 1954, and a second span was added in 1971.

The original Skyway was the site of two major maritime disasters over a four-month period, the second of which resulted in the bridge's partial destruction and eventual replacement. On the night of January 28, 1980, the United States Coast Guard Cutter  collided with the tanker Capricorn just west of the bridge, resulting in the sinking of the cutter with the loss of 23 crew members in the worst peacetime disaster in the history of the US Coast Guard. On the morning of May 9, 1980, the freighter MV Summit Venture collided with a support pier near the center of the bridge during a sudden squall, resulting in the catastrophic failure of the southbound roadway and the deaths of 35 people when several vehicles (including a Greyhound Bus) plunged into Tampa Bay. Within a few years, the damaged span was partially demolished, the surviving span was partially demolished and converted into a long fishing pier, and the modern Sunshine Skyway was built. The current bridge incorporates numerous safety features designed to protect the structure from ship collisions, as it spans one of the busiest shipping lanes in the United States.

History

Precursors and proposals 
In 1924, J.G. "Jim" Foley, a realtor, and his partner Charles R. Carter joined with James E. Bussey, an attorney, to create the Bee Line Ferry Company. The service started on March 7, 1927, and originally had two ferries: Fred D. Doty and the City of Wilmington (which was later renamed Pinellas). The ferry crossed from the end of Bay Vista Park in St. Petersburg and went to Piney Point on the other side of the bay.

A physiotherapist from St. Petersburg named Herman Simmonds proposed building a "high-level suspension bridge" in 1926. Sometime during 1927, Simmonds received congressional approval and a permit from the US War Department to build a bridge. However, efforts were put on hold due to the Great Depression.

The Florida State Legislature gave the Bee Line Ferry a franchise for 50 years to operate it in 1929. Another unsuccessful proposal to build a crossing would occur in 1929 when a bill was introduced into the state legislature to build a tunnel crossing lower Tampa Bay running from Pinellas Point to Piney Point. However this proposal was not successful in the end with unspecified "Tampa officials" arguing that any bridge or tunnel would be a navigational hazard during periods of war time.

The ferry service continued to expand with the Fred D. Doty being replaced by another ferry called the Manatee in 1932. A fourth vessel, the Sarasota was bought and put into service in 1937. Ferries departed every 30 minutes between 7:30 am and 9 pm during the winter. In the summer, they departed every 45 minutes. The ferry company ceased operating when the US federal government confiscated the boats as they needed them for the World War II war effort in 1942.

At close to the same time when the proposal from Simmonds ended, another proposal originating from Louis E. Saupe emerged. Saupe who was the head of the West Coast Bridge and Tunnel Co. wanted a combination of a causeway and a tunnel. The causeway portion would go from Maximo Point to Mullet Key while the tunnel portion would run for less than a 1/2 mile before transitioning to a causeway until reaching Terra Ceia. Pinellas County commissioners liked the idea and agreed to it. In 1939 they pushed state officials to approve it and the state legislature agreed to back it. Since the bridge would cross into part of Hillsborough County, which was not included in the bill for the bridge, it was declared unconstitutional.

In 1944, the St. Petersburg Port Authority bought the franchise from the company that operated the ferry. They continued to operate the ferry until the opening of the Sunshine Skyway Bridge.

Bail, Horton, and Associates along with Parsons, Brinckerhoff, Hogan & Macdonald received a contract from the port authority on December 20, 1944, to design the bridge. Both firms released a report in November 1945 about the bridge. Freeman Horton of Bail, Horton and Associates proposed Snead Island as its southern terminus and 10th Street in Palmetto be the thoroughfare. Bail, Horton, and Associates was awarded the contract but as it was unable to get $10 million in revenue bonds, the state government halted the project sometime during the late 1940s. The design competition was reactivated again in the early 1950s with Parsons, Brinckerhoff, Hogan & Macdonald getting the contract this time and they ended up serving as the engineers for construction and design. The partner-in-charge for Brinckerhoff was M. N. Quade. The successful attempt for building the bridge came after the Florida State Improvement Commission was approached with a proposal that they finance it while the State Road Department (SRD) built it. The Florida's State Improvement Commission proceeded to at some point take over the St. Petersburg Port Authority's assets which included $520,000 seen with bonded indebtedness. A $21,250,000 bond issue was passed by the Improvement Commission and sales started after the Port Authority's assets were acquired.

Construction of original bridge 
On July 4, 1950, a day-long celebration was held in St. Petersburg called "Spans Across the Bay". The name of the bridge was announced that day being the Sunshine Skyway Bridge. The name was submitted by Virginia Seymore of Indian Rocks, Florida as part of a national contest to give the bridge a name with 20,000 entries being submitted. The contest was held by the St. Pete Junior Chamber of Commerce and the State Road Department. Names that were prohibited would be those that referred to a person's name or a geographic place. Construction bids began to be accepted during that day as well. Construction started on October 19, 1950 with 544 people helping to build the bridge in total. It was built by the Virginia Bridge Company and another firm that was involved doing engineering work was Parsons, Brinckerhoff, Hall and McDonald. Staging areas for the construction of the bridge were established at both crossing sites. An entire concrete factory was established near Piney Point while prefabricated concrete parts were delivered via barge from a site in Tampa where they were made. 4,100,000 cubic yards of material would be dredged as part of building the causeways for the bridge. To physically build the bridge:  of structural steel,  of rebar and 115,980 cubic yards of concrete would be used.

Original bridge 

The original two-lane bridge opened to traffic on September 6, 1954. At the time of the bridge's opening it would be among the longest bridges on Earth and it was the longest continuous bridge in the United States. Notable participants in opening ceremonies that day would be: US Senator and former Governor Spessard Holland, former Governors Charley E. Johns and Fuller Warren along with James Melton and General James Van Fleet. Delegations from 10 Florida counties would participate that day as well. On the day the original bridge opened, it would be toll free from 11 AM to 11 PM. It was reported that 15,086 cars crossed the bridge starting at 11:40 AM when opening ceremonies ended and 11 PM when the toll free time ended.

There would be two lanes for it with no passing allowed. There would be no illumination as well making the bridge dark at night. The bridge would not be easily accessible to reach however and drivers would often have to take detours to reach it. US Route 19's final segment which ended at the Sunshine Skyway Bridge would be opened on July 19, 1955.

Second span 
In 1969, construction began on a second two-lane span was built beside the original to ease traffic and bring the bridge up to Interstate Highway standards. Opening of the newer span was delayed until 1971 for reinforcing of the south main pier, which had cracked due to insufficient supporting pile depth. It was dedicated on May 19, 1971. Both Governor Reuben Askew and the mayor of Bradenton, B.T. Arbuckle, attended the second span's dedication. The second span was used for all southbound traffic, while the original span was converted to carry northbound traffic.

1980 collapse 

Six cars, a truck, and a Greyhound bus plummeted  into Tampa Bay, resulting in thirty-five deaths. The only survivor of the fall was Wesley MacIntire, whose Ford Courier pickup truck bounced off the hull of the Summit Venture and into the water. MacIntire managed to escape his vehicle before it sank and was pulled to safety aboard the freighter. He sued the company that owned the ship and won a $175,000 settlement in 1984 ($ today). Several other drivers - including former Major League Baseball player Granny Hamner - were able to stop their vehicles in the stormy weather before reaching the gap.

John Lerro, the veteran harbor pilot who was steering the ship at the time of the accident, was cleared of wrongdoing by both a state grand jury and a Coast Guard investigation. A microburst with sudden torrential rains and  winds had hit the inbound freighter just as it was maneuvering into the narrow channel under the bridge, cutting visibility to near zero and temporarily rendering the ship's radar useless. Lerro put the ship's engines into full reverse and ordered the emergency dropping of the anchor as soon as he realized that the freighter was out of the channel, but the forward momentum of the 20,000-ton ship along with strong winds from astern pushed the bow into support beams to the right of the shipping lane. The main support pier nearest to the center of the bridge withstood the strike without significant damage, but the secondary pier just to the south was not designed to withstand such an impact and failed catastrophically, causing most of the span to fall into Tampa Bay.

Replacement bridge 
Soon after the disaster, the undamaged northbound span was converted back to a two-lane, two-way bridge while the state of Florida considered proposals for a replacement. Ideas included the construction of a tunnel (which was deemed impractical due to Florida's high water table) and a simple reconstruction of the broken section of the old bridge which would not widen the narrow shipping lane. Governor Bob Graham's idea to build a "signature" cable-stayed bridge with a span that would be 50% wider than that of the old Skyway Bridge won out over other proposals. In addition to a wider shipping lane, the channel would be marked by a -long series of large concrete barriers and the support piers would be protected by massive concrete "dolphins".

Construction began in January 1983 with the pounding of pilings for the foundation, and work on the main piers began the following September. The complicated project was delayed several times by bad weather and various difficulties in construction, and the planned opening was pushed back several times. Finally, the opening ceremony was set for April 30, 1987. However, on April 29 at about 3:30 PM, the new bridge's protective bumpers were hit head-on by the Deliverance, a  shrimp boat. The bumper sustained minor damage and the bridge was not affected, but the vessel took on water and was towed out of the channel into shallow waters, where it promptly sank. The opening ceremonies proceeded as scheduled.

Demolition of former bridge 
In 1990, the FDOT awarded a bid to Hardaway Company to demolish all steel and concrete sections of the older Sunshine Skyway spans. The scope of the project required that all underwater piles and piers, and surface roadway, girders, and beams be dismantled. Special care had to be taken in removing underwater bridge elements near the channel, and the central portion of the original bridge had to be removed in one piece to minimize closure of the only approach to the busy Port of Tampa. Most of the concrete material was used to create an artificial reef near the southbound approach of the old bridge, which was converted into a long pier for newly created Skyway Fishing Pier State Park. Unused approaches to the original spans were demolished in 2008.

Wesley MacIntire, the only survivor of the collapse, was the last person to drive over the intact original span before it was demolished. Accompanied by his wife, he stopped at the apex of the bridge and dropped 35 white carnations into the water, one for each person who died in the disaster.

Issues and concerns

Suicides 
At least 316 people have committed suicide by jumping from the bridge or its predecessors into the waters of Tampa Bay.  An estimated 48 others have survived. Many other missing persons are suspected of having jumped from the bridge but their deaths could not be confirmed as no bodies were recovered.

In response to the high number of suicide attempts from the bridge, the state of Florida installed six crisis hotline phones along the center span in 1999, and began 24-hour patrols. , the call center at the Crisis Center of Tampa Bay received 18 calls from potential jumpers, all of whom survived, according to a 2003 St. Petersburg Times report.

In 2006, a feature film Loren Cass was released, which depicted a suicide jump off the Sunshine Skyway. Two years later, a second filmmaker, Sean Michael Davis of Rhino Productions, was inspired by his haunting experience witnessing a woman jump off the bridge so quickly that no one could intervene, to create a not-for-profit film titled Skyway Down. His objectives: to deter other potential jumpers by " 'punch[ing] them in the face' with interviews with survivors and family members",  to give them "hope and to try to de-glorify the romanticism of the bridge", in part by informing those who have "mulled a leap to know about the bloody, battered aftermath."

In 2020, FDOT announced they would install the Skyway Vertical Net, a vertical barrier in an effort to deter suicide attempts. The vertical barrier was placed on the outside walls of the bridge and extends vertically  from the side barriers. The project was completed in June 2021.

As part of any Florida controlled-access highway, pedestrians and bicycles are prohibited. Stopping on the bridge for any non-emergency, including sightseeing, is prohibited. Traffic on the bridge is monitored by the Florida Highway Patrol, and a stopped vehicle, bicyclist, or pedestrian will result in a police dispatch.

Corrosion
A major problem with the Sunshine Skyway Bridge is corrosion of the steel in the precast concrete segmental columns on the high level approaches. Because the segments are hollow, workers were able to enter the bridge superstructure in 2003 and 2004 to reinforce the corroded sections of the bridge, ensuring its future safety. Another problem arose around 2005–06 when several news bureaus reported paint discolorations on the bridge's cables. These paint splotches and patches were a result of touch-ups that were performed sometime in 1998 but began to show through as a result of using newer, environmentally-safe paint. The change in the paint's composition caused it to fade faster than expected.

From 2006 to 2008, Florida Department of Transportation (FDOT) hired a contractor to perform the first full repainting of the bridge since it opened in 1987. The work included repainting the bridge's 42 steel cables one consistent shade of yellow and rehabilitating the lighting system at the summit of the bridge. In 2022, the yellow steel cables were repainted and corrosion protection was added to the ship impact system on each side of the channel.

Low clearance

Traffic

Usage and tourism
The former and current bridge have been featured in various forms of media. The original Sunshine Skyway Bridge is featured in Yours Truly, Johnny Dollar and the opening credits to Superboy. The current bridge has provided the setting for several films such as Loren Cass and The Punisher. The bridge also served as plot devices to various novels such as Dennis Lehane's 1997 novel Sacred and Ben Bova's 2005 novel Powersat. The bridge is also the subject of the song "Skyway Avenue" by We the Kings.

The United States Postal Service featured the bridge in 2012 on a Priority Mail postage stamp. Carl T. Hermann worked on the painting and the digital illustration was created by artist Dan Cosgrove.

In 2005, an act of the Florida Legislature officially named the current bridge the Bob Graham Sunshine Skyway Bridge, after the former Governor of Florida and then U.S. Senator who presided over its design and most of its construction. According to sources, he was inspired to suggest the current design by a visit to France, where he saw a similar cable-stayed bridge, the Brotonne Bridge. The original bridge was dedicated to state engineer William E. Dean, as noted on a plaque displayed at the rest area at the south end of the bridge.

In November 2017, work began on installing decorative lighting to the Skyway's columns, main spans, and sloped spans. The $15.6 million lighting project provides a visual aesthetic while also enhancing safety and security by providing more light to the underside of the bridge from dusk to dawn. Over 1,800 LEDs were installed along  of the bridge which cycles through animated routines. The lighting project was completed in October 2019 and funded by FDOT through collected toll fees.

Skyway 10K
On January 11, 1987, the Skyway Bridge opened up to 10,000 runners, joggers and walkers before the bridge was opened to motor vehicle traffic the following week. Runners participated in four races that ran simultaneously across the bridge, with two races going southbound and two races directed northbound.

On March 4, 2018, in partnership with the Armed Forces Families Foundation, the Skyway Bridge was closed for the Inaugural Skyway 10K. In contrast to the one-time race in 1987, the Skyway 10K has been held annually since 2018 with the exception of 2021 as it was cancelled due to the COVID-19 Pandemic and would be held virtually instead.

Gallery

Old bridge demolition

Current bridge

See also 
 
 
 
 Millau Viaduct, bridge with similar design in France

References

External links 

 
 
 Sunshine Skyway Bridge 1986

Bridge disasters in the United States
Bridge disasters caused by collision
Transportation disasters in Florida
Cable-stayed bridges in the United States
Steel bridges in the United States
Bridges completed in 1954
Bridges completed in 1971
Bridges completed in 1987
1987 establishments in Florida
1954 establishments in Florida
Landmarks in Florida
Bridges in Pinellas County, Florida
Transportation buildings and structures in Hillsborough County, Florida
Transportation buildings and structures in Manatee County, Florida
Buildings and structures in St. Petersburg, Florida
Tolled sections of Interstate Highways
Toll bridges in Florida
Bridges over Tampa Bay
Road bridges in Florida
Interstate 75
U.S. Route 19
Bridges on the Interstate Highway System
Bridges of the United States Numbered Highway System